John Jebb may refer to:

John Jebb (Dean of Cashel) (died 1787), Irish Anglican priest
John Jebb (reformer) (1736–1786), son of the latter, English clergyman and doctor
John Jebb (bishop) (1775–1833), bishop of Limerick
John Jebb (priest) (1805–1886), nephew of the latter, canon chancellor of Hereford Cathedral